There are 50 places where people can legally cross the Mexico–United States border.  Several large border cities have multiple crossings, often including one or more that bypass the center of the city and are designated for truck traffic.  For planned crossings, see the Proposed crossings section below.  For former border crossings, see the Closed crossings section below.  Details on each of the US ports of entry are provided using the links in the table.

On the U.S. side, each crossing has a three-letter Port of Entry code. This code is also seen on  passport entry stamp or parole stamp. The list of codes is administered by the Department of State. Note that one code may correspond to multiple crossings.



Vehicle and pedestrian crossings

Proposed crossings
This section lists crossings of the US-Mexico Border that are in the planning or construction phases.

Closed crossings

This table includes only those roads where the governments of either the US or Mexico once had Customs or Immigration services.

Also included are places where certain legitimate vehicular or vessel traffic has been permitted to cross the border in recent years.

Rail crossings

Closed rail crossings

Ferry crossings

See also
 List of Canada–United States border crossings
 List of crossings of the Rio Grande
 Roosevelt Reservation

References